Pseudohypatopa longicornutella is a moth in the family Blastobasidae first described by Kyu-Tek Park in 1999. It is found in Korea.

References

 , 1989, A review of Blastobasidae (Lepidoptera) in Korea, Korean Journal of Applied Entomology 28: 76–81.
 , 2008, A review of Pseudohypatopa Sinev (Lepidoptera: Coleophoridae: Blastobasinae: Holcocerini), with descriptions of two new species, Entomologica Fennica 19 (4): 241–247.

Blastobasidae